Amazon (also known as Peter Benchley's Amazon) was a syndicated adventure drama series created by Peter Benchley. It was developed by Canadian production companies Alliance Atlantis Communications & WIC Entertainment and German company Beta Film GmbH. The 22 episodes of the series were in first-run syndication between 1999 and 2000.

The drama series focused on the six survivors of a crashed airline flight in the Brazilian Amazon jungle. The group soon comes into contact with a hostile indigenous tribe, the Fierce Ones. They are taken in by a mysterious tribe called the Chosen, who are descended from 16th century British colonists who were lost in the rainforest. Relations with the Chosen are tenuous at best. Most of the group escapes the Chosen only to stir up a hornets' nest with the cannibalistic Jaguar People, led by an insane Canadian woman bent on domination of all the local tribes. The first season ended in a cliff-hanger, and a second season was never produced. The series retained sufficient interest that it was released on DVD in 2011. This was most likely to capitalize on the cult-popularity of Lost, with which it could all too easily be confused .

A novelization of the 2-hour pilot was written by Rob MacGregor, and a mass-market paperback was released by Harper (publisher) on 8 Aug 2000.

Cast
C. Thomas Howell as Dr. Alex Kennedy
Carol Alt as Karen Oldham
Fabiana Udenio as Pia Claire
Chris Martin as Jimmy Stack
Rob Stewart as Andrew Talbott
Tyler Hynes as Will Bauer

Episodes

Home media
Alliance Home Entertainment released the complete series on DVD in Canada only on 22 February 2011. This was soon followed by the release to the rest of the North American market.

References

External links

1990s Canadian drama television series
2000s Canadian drama television series
1999 Canadian television series debuts
2000 Canadian television series endings
First-run syndicated television programs in the United States
Television shows set in Brazil